Lorna Westbrook was an Australian actress who worked in the 1930s and 1940s.

She was a socialite discovered by Ken G. Hall who cast her in Dad Rudd MP.

Select credits
Dad Rudd MP (1940)
100,000 Cobbers (1943)

References

External links

20th-century Australian actresses
Year of birth missing
Possibly living people